Chagall — Malevich is a 2014 Russian biographical drama film directed by Alexander Mitta about the Vitebsk period in the life of the artist Marc Chagall and his relationship with fellow artist Kazimir Malevich. The film was released on April 3, 2014. It is the last film directed by Alexander Mitta. It also showed at the 2014 Busan International Film Festival.

Cast 
Leonid Bichevin - Marc Chagall
Christina Schneider - Bella Rosenfeld, wife of Chagall
 Anatoliy Beliy as Kazimir Malevich
Semyon Shkalikov - Naum
 Dmitry Astrakhan - Rebbe Aizik, rabbi
Alexey Ovsyannikov - Zheleznyak
Jacob Levda - Leva, student of Chagall
Sergey Migitsko - Israel Vulfovich Vishnyak
Tatyana Likhacheva - Vishnyak's wife
Semyon Mendelssohn - Trotsky
Vasily Ruksha - Amedeo Modigliani

References

External links
 

2014 films
2010s Russian-language films
2014 biographical drama films
2010s historical drama films
Russian biographical drama films
Biographical films about painters
Russian historical drama films
Films directed by Alexander Mitta